Natasha Zvereva successfully defended her title, defeating Julie Halard in the final, 6–4, 6–4 to win the girls' singles tennis title at the 1987 Wimbledon Championships.

Seeds

  Natasha Zvereva (champion)
  Arantxa Sánchez Vicario (second round)
  Nicole Provis (quarterfinals)
  Barbara Paulus (semifinals)
  Halle Cioffi (third round)
  Wiltrud Probst (third round)
  Radka Zrubáková (second round)
  Emmanuelle Derly (semifinals)
  Michelle Jaggard (third round)
  Nicole Arendt (first round)
  Amy Frazier (third round)
  Gabriela Mosca (quarterfinals)
  Brenda Schultz (quarterfinals)
  Kim Il-soon (third round)
  Natalia Medvedeva (second round)
  Paulette Moreno (second round)

Draw

Finals

Top half

Section 1

Section 2

Bottom half

Section 3

Section 4

References

External links

Girls' Singles
Wimbledon Championship by year – Girls' singles